Cryptazeca monodonta is a species of small, air-breathing land snail, a terrestrial pulmonate gastropod mollusk in the family Azecidae.

Distribution
This species is found in France and Spain.

References

Cryptazeca
Gastropods described in 1876
Taxonomy articles created by Polbot